St. Patrick's Catholic Church and Rectory is a historic building at 1219 2nd Avenue, S. in Nashville, Tennessee, United States.  It was built in 1890 and added to the National Register of Historic Places in 1984.

References

1890s architecture in the United States
Roman Catholic churches in Nashville, Tennessee
Churches on the National Register of Historic Places in Tennessee
Roman Catholic churches in Tennessee
Second Empire architecture in Tennessee
National Register of Historic Places in Nashville, Tennessee